The weightlifting competition at the 1948 Summer Olympics in London consisted of six weight classes, all for men only.  The bantamweight division was a newly created weight class, marking the first change to the Olympic program since 1920.

Medal summary

Medal table

References

Sources
 

 
1948 Summer Olympics events
1948
1948 in weightlifting
International weightlifting competitions hosted by the United Kingdom